Sylvia Wassertheil-Smoller (born 1932) is an American epidemiologist and Distinguished University Professor Emerita in the Department of Epidemiology & Population Health at Albert Einstein College of Medicine, where she first joined the faculty in 1969. She also serves as Dorothy and William Manealoff Foundation and Molly Rosen Chair in Social Medicine Emerita at the Albert Einstein College of Medicine, as a principal investigator of their Women's Health Initiative, and as co-principal investigator for their site in the Hispanic Community Health Study. She is a fellow of the American College of Epidemiology, the New York Academy of Sciences, and the American Heart Association.

References

External links
Faculty profile 
Personal website

American women epidemiologists
American epidemiologists
1932 births
Living people
Albert Einstein College of Medicine faculty
Syracuse University alumni
New York University alumni
American women academics
20th-century American scientists
20th-century American women scientists
21st-century American scientists
21st-century American women scientists
Date of birth missing (living people)
Fellows of the American College of Epidemiology